Willem "Wim" Polak (14 September 1924 – 1 October 1999) was a Dutch politician of the Labour Party (PvdA) and economist.

Polak was born to a Jewish merchant family in Amsterdam on 14 September 1924. His parents were murdered by the Nazis during the German Occupation of the Netherlands. After the Second World War, he worked as a journalist for Het Vrije Volk. Polak was appointed Secretary of State for local finances in Joop den Uyl's government. He worked towards improving the financial position of the larger Dutch cities. Subsequently, he became mayor of Amsterdam for a six-year period, where his challenges included numerous squatting cases as well as riots related to Queen Beatrix's coronation.

He died in 1999 at his home in Ilpendam.

Decorations

References

External links

Official
  W. (Wim) Polak Parlement & Politiek

 

1924 births
1999 deaths
Aldermen of Amsterdam
Commanders of the Order of Orange-Nassau
Deaths from cancer in the Netherlands
Dutch corporate directors
Dutch Jews
Dutch nonprofit directors
Dutch newspaper editors
Dutch people of World War II
Dutch political writers
Knights of the Order of the Netherlands Lion
Mayors of Amsterdam
Members of the Council of State (Netherlands)
Jewish Dutch politicians
Jewish Dutch writers
Jewish mayors of places in the Netherlands
People from Waterland
State Secretaries for the Interior of the Netherlands
University of Amsterdam alumni
20th-century Dutch civil servants
20th-century Dutch economists
20th-century Dutch male writers
20th-century Dutch politicians
20th-century Dutch journalists